The KGB Espionage Museum was a museum dedicated to the unbiased presentation of historical and contemporary KGB espionage equipment and tradecraft. The museum opened in the Chelsea/Greenwich Village area of New York City on 17 January 2019 and featured the world's largest collection of KGB-specific spy equipment. The museum offered interactive exhibits and guided tours. The museum closed in fall 2020 due to the impact of COVID-19 and its contents were auctioned.

History and formation 
The museum in Manhattan was founded in 2019 by Lithuanian father and daughter team Julius Urbaitis and Agne Urbaityte. The collection began under private ownership by Mr. Urbaitis in Lithuania where their first museum opened in an old KGB bunker. The majority of the collection wasbrought to the United States and was available for public view for the first time.

Permanent collection 
The KGB Espionage Museum was 4,000 sq. feet (370 sq. meters) and exhibited over 3900 objects. The collection consists of original pieces and two replicas. Prize objects include a lipstick gun known as the "Kiss of Death", a Fialka Machine (the Russian version of the Enigma Machine), and a suicide tooth filled with poison.

Exhibitions 
The museum divided their collection into the following rough categories:

Spy Cameras
 Recording Devices
 Concealed Listening Devices
Cipher Machines
 Spy Radios
 KGB Telephones

Interactive exhibits 
The KGB Espionage Museum offered several areas of interactivity for visitors such as:

 A KGB Interrogation Chair
 Morse Keys
 Switchboards
 KGB Chief's Desk
 Robotic Arm
 KGB Prison Bed
KGB Uniform Photo Booth

Tours 

 "Guided Tour": A guided experience
 "Dark Side of the KGB" Tour: A guided tour of the museum in the dark using soviet flashlights
 "Come Back in the USSR 1991" Tour: Experiential tour where the visitor dresses as a KGB cadet, learns how to put on a gas mask, and experiences a KGB interrogation

References

External links 
KGB Espionage Museum Website

Museums in New York City
KGB